Cytonn Towers is a planned mixed-use skyscraper development, consisting of three towers of 35 storeys each, in Nairobi, Kenya's capital and largest city. The development is targeted towards the upper middle class, non-governmental organisations and diplomatic missions.

Location
The geographical coordinates of the proposed real estate development are: 01°17'34.0"S, 36°46'47.0"E (Latitude:-1.292778; Longitude:36.779722).

Overview
The development is owned by Cytonn Investments Management Limited, a privately-owned equity investment company. It consists of three towers, the tallest of which is 35 storeys tall.

It will consist of 180 hotel rooms, 160 serviced apartments, three bedroom duplexes and penthouse suites. Three basement floors will accommodate 1,500 parked vehicles.

The mixed use development is aimed at satisfying demand for  luxury housing, upscale business office space, hotel and conferencing venues. It is expected to host a sky-bridge restaurant, a ballroom, a fitness club and an observatory deck.

Construction
The budgeted cost of construction is KSh 20 billion (approx. US$200 million). This includes KSh 1.5 billion (approx. US$15 million) used to acquire the land. Construction is expected to start in November 2018 and last until December 2022.

Funding will be provided by local and international fund managers, with Finnish asset manager Taaleri Plc, being the lead investor.

References

External links
 About Cytonn Towers
 Kenya: Kilimani Residents Oppose Plan to Build 35-Storey Tower in Their Posh Estate As at 12 April 2018.

Skyscraper office buildings in Kenya
Buildings and structures in Nairobi
Proposed infrastructure
Nairobi